The following timeline is a chronological list of all the major events leading up to, during, and immediately following the September 11 attacks against the United States in 2001 timeline starts with the completion of the first World Trade Center tower in 1970 through the first anniversary of the attacks in 2002.

Background history 
1939: The New York World's Fair includes an exhibit entitled the "World Trade Center." 
1946: Winthrop W. Aldrich, the organizer of the World Trade Center exhibit at the World's Fair, first proposes a permanent World Trade Center in New York City, but the State of New York opts to modernize the city's existing ports instead. 
1950: Sayyid Qutb returns to Egypt from a two-year visit from the United States sponsored by the Ministry of Education, and joins the Muslim Brotherhood due to his disgust towards Western culture. 
1951–1965: Qutb writes the book Fi Zilal al-Quran while in prison for an assassination attempt against Gamal Abdel Nasser. The book claims that Israel and the Arab states of the Persian Gulf are American satellite states and calls for an Islamist revolution against secularism—including Arab nationalism, socialism, and liberal democracy—to establish a Middle Eastern theocracy rooted in sharia law. The book also concludes that any Muslims who support secularism are takfir. The book becomes highly influential towards Islamic terrorists. 
March 10, 1957: Osama bin Laden is born in Riyadh to billionaire businessman Mohammed bin Laden.
1959: David Rockefeller revives the idea of a "World Trade Center" to revitalize Lower Manhattan, and creates the Downtown-Lower Manhattan Association to lobby for a $250 million complex close to the Fulton Fish Market centered around a single 70-story office building. The Port Authority of New York and New Jersey under the directorship of Austin J. Tobin soon approves the plan and specifies that it must be taller than the Empire State Building, at the time the tallest building in both in the United States and the world.
1964: Minoru Yamasaki's design for the original World Trade Center, including the Twin Towers, is unveiled by the Port Authority.
1966: Construction begins on the original World Trade Center. 
1966: Sayyid Qutb is executed in Egypt and his brother Muhammad Qutb flees to Saudi Arabia, acquiring a teaching position at King Abdulaziz University in Jeddah.
1970: The North Tower of the original World Trade Center is completed.
1973: The South Tower of the original World Trade Center is completed.
1976–1980: Bin Laden is radicalized by Qutb while attending King Abdulaziz University for business administration.
1979: The United States first becomes concerned over Islamism after the Iranian Revolution, the Iran hostage crisis, and the Grand Mosque seizure.
1980: Bin Laden travels to Pakistan to volunteer and assist the Sunni Mujahideen fighting the "holy war" across the border in Afghanistan, a year after the Soviet Union invaded the country.
1981: Bin Laden's future deputy Ayman al-Zawahiri, the leader of Jama At al-Jihad, is arrested for his role in the assassination of Anwar Sadat and imprisoned for three years.
1983: The 1983 Beirut barracks bombings targeting the Multinational Force in Lebanon during the Lebanese Civil War provides inspiration for Bin Laden.
October 1984: Bin Laden cofounds a network, the Maktab al-Khidamat, with Abdullah Yusuf Azzam in Afghanistan and Pakistan to recruit Muslims for the Afghan resistance.
1986: Bin Laden travels to Afghanistan to lead MAK forces in combat.
February 1987: Al-Qaeda establishes its first training camps in Afghanistan. 
May 25, 1987: Bin Laden withstands a Soviet attack during the Battle of Jaji, establishing his reputation in the Arab world. 
December 8, 1987: The First Intifada begins in Palestine. Bin Laden expresses vocal support for the conflict, and begins to advocate in favor of jihad against the West.
1988: Osama bin Laden forms a computer database of Islamist militants, founding al-Qaeda. He declares that Muslims must protect the holy sites of Mecca and Medina from foreign control as a religious duty. 
February 15, 1989: The Soviet Army completes its withdrawal from Afghanistan, and bin Laden advocates transforming al-Qaeda into a global network to fund jihad. Azzam prefers to focus on the Afghan Civil War and the Israeli–Palestinian conflict. 
May–June 1989: Al-Qaeda forces are badly defeated by the Afghan National Army in the Battle of Jalalabad, leading to a drop in membership and reorientation of tactics. 
June 30, 1989: Omar al-Bashir and Hassan Al-Turabi's National Islamic Front seize control of Sudan in a coup d'état. Al-Turabi would invite bin Laden to stay in the country.
November 1989: Bin Laden returns to Saudi Arabia and Prince Turki bin Faisal rejects his offer to send al-Qaeda to overthrow the Communist government in South Yemen.  
November 24, 1989: Azzam is assassinated in a car bombing, allowing bin Laden to dominate the organization. 
May 22, 1990: The governments of South and North Yemen merge into the unified Republic of Yemen. Bin Laden runs afoul of the Saudi Interior Ministry for attempting to violently disrupt the unification process.
August 2, 1990: Ba'athist Iraq invades and annexes Kuwait. Fearing an Iraqi threat to Eastern Province oilfields, King Fahd rapidly accepts American military assistance to the opposition of Bin Laden. 
September 1990: Bin Laden makes an offer to Sultan bin Abdulaziz Al Saud to defend Saudi Arabia from Ba'athist Iraq with 100,000 fighters after the Iraqi invasion of Kuwait. He is turned down, and becomes embittered by the intervention of non-Islamic troops from the U.S.-led international coalition in the Gulf War.
November 5, 1990: El Sayyid Nosair commits the assassination of Meir Kahane at the New York Marriott East Side, one of the first Islamist terrorist attacks in the United States. The FBI subsequently finds documents linking the attack to al-Qaeda, making it the organization's first involvement in attacks in the United States.
April 1991: Bin Laden moves to Sudan and begins expanding al-Qaeda using legitimate businesses as front organizations.
1992: Bin Laden begins to target U.S. military forces in the Arabian Peninsula and the Horn of Africa, as well as to consider alliances with Shiite Iranian-backed organizations such as Hezbollah. 
April 27, 1992: The Democratic Republic of Afghanistan collapses after Hezb-e Islami Gulbuddin seizes Kabul, but a new stage of civil war begins when the Peshawar Accords collapse.
December 29, 1992: Al-Qaeda attacks U.S. military forces for the first time in the Yemen hotel bombings in Aden.
February 26, 1993: Ramzi Yousef carries out the 1993 World Trade Center bombing.
October 3–4, 1993: 18 American servicemen are killed by al-Qaeda-trained forces in the Battle of Mogadishu.
April 9, 1994: Bin Laden's Saudi citizenship is revoked.
September 1994: Mohammed Omar founds the Taliban in Kandahar. 
 December 24, 1994: Armed Islamic Group of Algeria militants attempt to crash Air France Flight 8969 into the Eiffel Tower, influencing al-Qaeda's future planning. 
 January 6, 1995: Operation Bojinka, a planned terrorist attack, is discovered by the Filipino police in Manila on a laptop computer in an apartment after a fire.
February 7, 1995: Ramzi Yousef is arrested in Pakistan, and is discovered to have financial links to Bin Laden.
June 1995: U.S. intelligence links al-Qaeda to an unsuccessful assassination attempt against Egyptian President Hosni Mubarak in Addis Ababa, Ethiopia. 
January 8, 1996: As Bin Laden makes bellicose statements regarding United States and Saudi Arabia. Michael Scheuer creates a CIA unit, the Bin Laden Issue Station, to gather intelligence on Bin Laden.
May 18, 1996: Heading from Africa to Asia, Bin Laden moves to Afghanistan providing him a safe haven for al-Qaeda activities.
June 25, 1996: Al-Qaeda commits the Khobar Towers bombing targeting American servicemen in Saudi Arabia to participate in Operation Southern Watch. 
August 23, 1996: Bin Ladin issues a fatwa declaring war on the United States, which is published in the Arabic-language newspaper Al-Quds Al-Arabi in London. The FBI and the U.S. Attorney for the Southern District of New York open a criminal file on him under the charge of seditious conspiracy. 
September 27, 1996: The Taliban, a radical Islamic movement, rises to power by conquering Kabul and declares the Islamic Emirate of Afghanistan. 
November 1996: Informant Jamal al-Fadl reveals the existence of al-Qaeda to the FBI.  
November 23, 1996: Attackers hijack Ethiopian Airlines Flight 961 and most of the passengers die in the resulting crash landing.
February 1998: Bin Laden expands religious edict against US and allies by issuing a second fatwa calling on Muslims to join a jihad against Jews and Christians until the United States and Israel evacuate the Middle East, and reiterates the themes in a televised interview with ABC News.
 1998: 9/11 hijacker Mohamed Atta and associates are monitored some by US and Germany in their Hamburg apartment.
June 8, 1998: A U.S. grand jury delivers a sealed indictment of bin Laden for "conspiracy to attack defense utilities of the United States."
 August 7, 1998: The 1998 U.S. embassy bombings in Kenya and Tanzania bring al-Qaeda to US public attention for the first time.
 August 8–10, 1998: In Mazar-i-Sharif, the Taliban and Al Qaeda's 055 Brigade massacred between 4,000 and 8,000 people, including 11 Iranian diplomats. Iran threatened to intervene, but relented after mediation by the United Nations.
 August 20, 1998: Operation Infinite Reach, U.S. cruise missile strikes on Al-Qaeda training camp in Khost, Afghanistan, in retaliation of Al-Qaeda's U.S. embassy bombings two weeks earlier.
1998: An embassy bombing suspect claims that an 'extensive network of al-Qaeda sleeper agents' is planning a 'big attack' inside the United States.
October 8, 1999: Al-Qaeda is designated as a Foreign Terrorist Organisation by the U.S. State Department. The Federal Aviation Administration instructs airlines to maintain "a high degree of alertness" against the organization.
October 15, 1999: The United Nations Security Council passes a resolution demanding that the Taliban extradite Bin Ladin. 
October 31, 1999: Suicide pilot crashes EgyptAir Flight 990 into the ocean.
November–December 1999: The 2000 millennium attack plots for bombings in Jordan and Los Angeles International Airport are discovered and prevented.
December 1999: Indian Airlines Flight 814 hijacked. One passenger dies while the others are released.
 October 12, 2000: The USS Cole is bombed in Yemen by Al-Qaeda.
July 10, 2001: FBI Agent Kenneth Williams writes a memo warning that al-Qaeda members are training at flight schools in the United States, and CIA Director George Tenet briefs officials such as National Security Advisor Condoleezza Rice. 
August 6, 2001: President George W. Bush receives the President's Daily Brief Bin Ladin Determined To Strike in US warning of an imminent attack on the United States by al-Qaeda. 
September 4, 2001: The United States National Security Council prepares a $200 million plan to aid opponents of the Taliban in the Afghan Civil War, but it is not presented to President Bush. 
 September 9, 2001: Al-Qaeda assassinates Ahmad Shah Massoud, commander of the Northern Alliance.

Planning 

 1992: Mohamed Atta arrives in Germany.
 1994: Planning on Operation Bojinka begins in the Philippines.
 1995: Operation Bojinka foiled, Said Bahaji and Ramzi bin al-Shibh arrive in Germany.
 1996: Marwan al-Shehhi and Ziad Jarrah arrive in Germany.
 1997: Zakariyah Essabar arrives in Germany.
 1998: Recruitment of terrorists in Germany starts.
 1998: Bill Clinton warned 'bin Laden preparing to hijack US aircraft' inside US.
 1999: Hamburg cell is fully formed.
 1999: Germany monitors call to 9/11 hijacker al-Shehhi, shares information with CIA.
 1999: Germans monitor call mentioning key al-Qaeda Hamburg cell members, including 9/11 hijacker Atta's full name and number.
 1999: 9/11 hijacker Jarrah has unofficial wedding; photograph later suggests German intelligence has informant.
 1999: Three 9/11 hijackers obtain US visas.
 1999: Hani Hanjour obtains pilot's license despite dubious skills.
 1999: German intelligence records calls between 9/11 hijacker al-Shehhi and others linked to al-Qaeda.
 1999: Saudi ambassador's wife gives funds that are possibly passed to 9/11 hijackers.
 1999: President Clinton warned about al-Qaeda operatives living in US.
 1999: Watch list importance is stressed but procedures are not followed.
 1999: NSA tells CIA about planned al-Qaeda summit involving future hijackers.
 2000: 2000 al-Qaeda Summit in Malaysia, pilots head to the United States and attend flight training schools.
 2001: Remaining hijackers go to the United States, Zacarias Moussaoui goes to the United States and is arrested, other cell members flee Germany.

September 11, 2001

All times are in local time (EDT or UTC − 4).
 7:59 A.M.: American Airlines Flight 11 takes off from Boston Logan, bound for Los Angeles. 
 8:14 A.M.: United Airlines Flight 175 takes off from Boston Logan, also bound for Los Angeles.
 8:20 A.M.: American Airlines Flight 77 takes off from Washington Dulles International Airport, also bound for Los Angeles.
 8:42 A.M.: United Airlines Flight 93 takes off from Newark International Airport, bound for San Francisco International Airport.
 8:42–46 A.M.: Flight 175 is hijacked.
 8:46:40 A.M.: Flight 11 crashes into the North Tower of the World Trade Center between the 93rd and 99th floors.
 8:50–54 A.M.: Flight 77 is hijacked.
 9:03:02 A.M.: Flight 175 crashes into the South Tower of the World Trade Center between the 77th and 85th floors.
 9:28 A.M.: Flight 93 is hijacked.
 9:37:46 A.M.: Flight 77 crashes into The Pentagon.
 9:59:00 A.M.: The South Tower collapses.
 10:03:11 A.M.: Flight 93 crashes into a field in Shanksville, Pennsylvania.
 10:28:22 A.M.: The North Tower collapses.

Rest of September 

 September 13: On the personal orders of Queen Elizabeth II, The 'Star-Spangled Banner' is played during the Changing of the Guard at Buckingham Palace, marking the first time a foreign national anthem was played outside Buckingham Palace on an occasion other than a state visit. Russia observes a minute's silence. 
 September 14 to September 21: Worldwide stock markets plummet. 
 September 15: CIA director George Tenet presents the Worldwide Attack Matrix.
 September 20: George W. Bush announces that the US is at war.

October 

 October 1: Rudy Giuliani speaks to the United Nations General Assembly.
 October 7: U.S. Attack on Afghanistan commences.

Beyond October 

 March 2002: The Tribute in Light project begins.
 September 11, 2002: First anniversary of the September 11, 2001 attacks commemorations are held throughout the world, particularly the U.S.

References

External links
 "Complete 911 Timeline" - Provided by the Center for Cooperative Research.
 "White House whitewashers" (written September 27, 2001)
 "Attacks prompt widespread closings" (written September 11, 2001)
 Barter, Sheila, "How the World Trade Center fell". BBC

zh:九一一袭击事件#911当天大事记